The ARM Cortex-X1 is a central processing unit implementing the ARMv8.2-A 64-bit instruction set designed by ARM Holdings' Austin design centre as part of ARM's Cortex-X Custom (CXC) program.

Design 
The Cortex-X1 design is based on the ARM Cortex-A78, but redesigned for purely performance instead of a balance of performance, power, and area (PPA).

The Cortex-X1 is a 5-wide decode out-of-order superscalar design with a 3K macro-OP (MOPs) cache. It can fetch 5 instructions and 8 MOPs per cycle, and rename and dispatch 8 MOPs, and 16 µOPs per cycle. The out-of-order window size has been increased to 224 entries. The backend has 15 execution ports with a pipeline depth of 13 stages and the execution latencies consists of 10 stages. It also features 4x128b SIMD units.

ARM claims the Cortex-X1 offers 30% faster integer and 100% faster machine learning performance than the ARM Cortex-A77.

The Cortex-X1 supports ARM's DynamIQ technology, expected to be used as high-performance cores when used in combination with the ARM Cortex-A78 mid and ARM Cortex-A55 little cores.

Architecture changes in comparison with ARM Cortex-A78 

 Around 20% performance improvement (+30% from A77)
 30% faster integer
 100% faster machine learning performance
 Out-of-order window size has been increased to 224 entries (from 160 entries)
 Up to 4x128b SIMD units (from 2x128b)
 15% more silicon area
 5-way decode (from 4-way)
 8 MOPs/cycle decoded cache bandwidth (from 6 MOPs/cycle)
 64 KB L1D + 64 KB L1I (from 32/64 KB L1)
 Up to 1 MB/core L2 cache (from 512 KB/core max)
 Up to 8 MB L3 cache (from 4 MB max)

Licensing 
The Cortex-X1 is available as SIP core to partners of their Cortex-X Custom (CXC) program, and its design makes it suitable for integration with other SIP cores (e.g. GPU, display controller, DSP, image processor, etc.) into one die constituting a system on a chip (SoC).

Usage 
 Samsung Exynos 2100
 Qualcomm Snapdragon 888(+)
 Google Tensor

See also 

 ARM Cortex-A78, related high performance microarchitecture
 Comparison of ARMv8-A cores, ARMv8 family

References 

ARM processors